Martin is an unincorporated community and census-designated place in Keith County, Nebraska, United States. As of the 2010 census it had a population of 92. Martin Bay is one of the most popular recreation areas on Lake McConaughy.

Geography
Martin is in north-central Keith County, on the northern side of Lake McConaughy just north of Kingsley Dam, the lake's outlet. The lake is an impoundment on the North Platte River.

The community sits at the intersection of Nebraska Highways 61 and 92. Highway 61 leads south  to Ogallala, the Keith county seat, and north  to Arthur, while Highway 92 leads west along the north side of Lake McConaughy  to Lewellen.

Demographics

History
Martin got its start following construction of the Union Pacific Railroad through the territory.

References

Census-designated places in Keith County, Nebraska
Census-designated places in Nebraska